Vouga River is a river in the Centro Region of Portugal.
The course of the river ends in the Atlantic Ocean, in the form of a ria, the Ria de Aveiro.

Tributaries
 Águeda   (left bank)
 Caima    (right bank)
 Sul      (right bank)
 Teixeira (right bank)

Environment
Cacia pulp and paper mill effluent, one of the major polluting sources of the Vouga River and Aveiro Lagoon, is discharged into the Aveiro coastal area. The area has an unpleasant smell due to the effluent.

Rivers of Portugal
Natura 2000 in Portugal